University College Ghent, commonly known as HoGent, is the largest university college in Flanders, with three faculties, one School of Arts and over 17,000 students as of 2022. Its establishment in 1995 is the outcome of two successful mergers that involved sixteen Belgian institutions of higher education. Many had been influential leaders in higher education for several decades. The current faculties are spread over the city center of Ghent and Aalst.

Organisation 
Ghent University of Applied Sciences and Arts is one of the 17 university colleges in Flanders. It was founded in 1995 when thirteen institutes of higher education merged. In 2001, a second merger took place to form Ghent University of Applied Sciences and Arts as we know it today. In 2003, Ghent University of Applied Sciences and Arts became part of the Ghent University Association, a cooperative body of universities and university colleges.

The governing bodies of Ghent University of Applied Sciences and Arts are the Board of Governors, the President, the Executive Board, the Principal, the Deans and the Faculty Councils.

Faculties 
Ghent University of Applied Sciences and Arts consists of three faculties and one School of Arts. Each of these entities is led by a dean, who is responsible for the day-to-day management of his or her faculty.

 Education, Health & Social Work
 Science & Technology
 Business & Information Management
 School of Arts

Campus 
Ghent University of Applied Sciences and Arts is a modern urban university college located throughout the city of Ghent. There are also campuses in the neighbouring cities of Aalst and Melle.

Student facilities and services 
Student facilities include libraries, concert halls, learning centres, research and study centres, a 3,000 m² sports centre and much more. Additionally, Ghent University of Applied Sciences and Arts offers its students a complete range of student services, from housing and catering to student jobs, cultural events and medical assistance. All these services are centrally organized by the Office for Student Services and Student Life.

Study programmes 
Ghent University of Applied Sciences and Arts offers a wide range of bachelor and master programmes in the following fields of study:

 Applied Engineering & Technology
 Applied Linguistics
 Architecture
 Audio-Visual & Visual Arts
 Biotechnology
 Business Administration
 Education
 Health Care
 Music & Performing Arts
 Social & Community Work

Some of the study programmes are taught exclusively in English. These programmes are specifically organized for foreign exchange students, but they are also open to Belgian students.

 Master of Audiovisual Arts
 Master of Fine Arts
 Master of Music
 Audiology
 Applied
 Information Technology
 Business, Retail and Languages
 Nursing
 Nutrition and Dietetics
 Occupational Therapy
 Social Educational Care Work
 Social Work
 Speech and Language Pathology

Furthermore, Ghent University of Applied Sciences and Arts also offers a wide variety of follow-up programmes.

Research and service provision 

Besides focusing on education, Ghent University of Applied Sciences and Arts also continues to stress the importance of research and service provision. The multi-sector learning environment has a strong research tradition and boasts a number of research groups whose excellence is recognized internationally.

Nearly 414 researchers are actively involved in more than 110 research projects.

Funding 
In 2008, Ghent University of Applied Sciences and Arts’ research funds totalled €13 million, an increase of €2 million euros on the previous year.

International 
Each Ghent University of Applied Sciences and Arts faculty has cooperation agreements with a number of partner institutions, amounting to 250 bilateral agreements with institutions from 26 European countries.

Arts

Art faculties 
The School of Arts at Ghent University of Applied Sciences and Arts encompasses the former Royal Academy of Fine Arts (Ghent), founded in 1741 and merged into the university in 1995, and the Royal Conservatory.  Concerts and exhibitions are organized throughout the academic year.

The Royal Conservatory 

The Royal Conservatory ("Koninklijk Conservatorium") was one of the sixteen cultural institution merged into the university in 1995, with a history and heritage in its own right.  The founding director was Martin-Joseph Mengal, in 1835.  Notable students and faculty at the conservatory have included François-Auguste Gevaert, who studied directly under Mengal in 1841, Paul-Henri-Joseph Lebrun, who studied here and became a professor, and Edouard Potjes, who served as professor of piano for 22 years.

Art library 
At the Faculty of Music and Drama, the art library will be moved and expanded in the course of 2009-2010. This is a very important step in the creation of a stimulating working environment for both artists and art students. Moreover, in 2010, Ghent University of Applied Sciences and Arts will have a new and professional exhibition infrastructure for artistic productions.

A Prior 
A Prior is an international magazine for contemporary art, published by the Faculty of Fine Arts. It is one of the media through which the activities and research at the Faculty of Fine Arts are communicated.

References

External links 

 Website of the Hogeschool Gent

Colleges in Belgium
Educational institutions established in 1995
Ghent University
Aalst, Belgium
1995 establishments in Belgium